Samba Traoré (1993) is a Burkinabé drama film in the Mossi language (Mòoré) directed by Idrissa Ouedraogo. It was entered into the 43rd Berlin International Film Festival where it won the Silver Bear.

Plot
Two men hold up a gas station in the middle of the night. One of them is killed. The other one, Samba, flees with a suitcase full of money. He returns to his village with his new fortune and starts a new life. He opens a bar, gets married… But he cannot forget what he did. He lives in constant fear of getting caught by the police and his neighbors wonder about his past… Can one forget the murky past and return to a normal life so easily?

References

External links
 

1993 films
1993 drama films
Films directed by Idrissa Ouedraogo
Films set in Africa
More-language films
French independent films
South African independent films
Burkinabé independent films
Films shot in Burkina Faso
Burkinabé drama films
1993 independent films
South African drama films
1990s French films